Leucocryptos is a genus of single-celled eukaryotes comprising one to two species.

Species 

L. marina
L. remigera (moved to Kathablepharis remigera)

References 

Hacrobia genera
Katablepharida